Michael Huemer (born 27 December 1969) is a professor of philosophy at the University of Colorado, Boulder. He has defended ethical intuitionism, direct realism, libertarianism, veganism, and philosophical anarchism.

Education and career

Huemer graduated from the University of California, Berkeley and earned his Ph.D. at Rutgers University in 1998 under the supervision of Peter D. Klein.

Philosophical work

Huemer's book Ethical Intuitionism (2005) was reviewed in Notre Dame Philosophical Reviews,  Philosophy and Phenomenological Research and Mind.

Huemer is the author of The Problem of Political Authority (2013) which argues that the modern arguments for political authority fail and that society can function properly without state coercion. In a review, philosopher Aeon J. Skoble stated that Huemer "joins the ranks of twenty-first-century philosophical defenders of an anarchist position that is rooted in a conception of the efficacy of voluntary and competitive institutions."

Veganism

Huemer is an advocate of ethical vegetarianism (veganism). In 2016, Huemer debated Bryan Caplan on the ethical treatment of animals, including insects. In 2018, Huemer commented "In the overwhelming majority of actual cases, meat eaters do not have any reasons that could plausibly be claimed to justify the pain and suffering caused by their practice."

His Dialogues on Ethical Vegetarianism (2019) is a series of dialogues on the ethics of eating meat. Peter Singer who wrote the foreword to book commented that "In the future, when people ask me why I don’t eat meat, I will tell them to read this book.”

Books

Authored
Skepticism and the Veil of Perception (Rowman & Littlefield, 2001)
Ethical Intuitionism (Palgrave Macmillan, 2005)
The Problem of Political Authority (Palgrave Macmillan, 2013)
Approaching Infinity (Palgrave Macmillan, 2016)
Paradox Lost (Palgrave Macmillan, 2018)
Dialogues on Ethical Vegetarianism (Routledge, 2019)
Knowledge, Reality, and Value: A Mostly Common Sense Guide to Philosophy (Independently published, 2021)
Justice Before the Law (Palgrave Macmillan, 2021)

Edited
 Epistemology: Contemporary Readings (Routledge, 2002)

References

Further reading

External links
 Faculty webpage
Official Website

1969 births
Living people
21st-century American philosophers
American anarcho-capitalists
American animal rights scholars
American libertarians
American political philosophers
American veganism activists
Philosophy academics
Rutgers University alumni
University of California, Berkeley alumni
University of Colorado faculty